Huet may refer to:

People
 Alfred Huet du Pavillon (A.Huet, 1829-1907), a botanist
 Conrad Busken Huet (1826–1886), Dutch literary critic
 Cristobal Huet (born 1975), goaltender for Lausanne HC ice hockey team in Switzerland.
 Edmond Huet, Paris Metro engineer
 Gérard Huet (born 1947), French computer scientist
 Guénhaël Huet (born 1956), French politician
 Gustavo Huet (born 1912), Mexican Olympic shooter
 Henri Huet (1927–1971), French war photographer killed in Vietnam
 Jan Huet (1903–1976), Belgian stained glass painter
 Jean-Baptiste Huet (1745–1811), French painter and designer
 Judith Benhamou-Huet, French journalist and art specialist
 Marie Huet, French painter and fashion designer
 Paul Huet (1803–1869), French painter
 Pierre Daniel Huet (1630–1721), bishop of Soissons
 Sophie Huet (1953-2017), French journalist
 Thomas Huet (died 1591), Welsh biblical scholar

Other uses
 Helicopter Underwater Escape Training

ru:Юэ